Alexander Riese (2 June 1840, Frankfurt – 8 October 1924, Frankfurt) was a German classical scholar. An R, after his surname, indicates the canonical numeration for poems surviving in the Anthologia Latina, of which he edited into a more critically accurate collection than the original nucleus.

Biography
He was born in Frankfurt am Main and received his education at the universities of Erlangen, Bonn and Berlin. Following graduation he served as an adjunct at the Joachimsthalsches Gymnasium in Berlin. In 1864 he obtained his habilitation and four years later became an associate professor at the University of Heidelberg. From 1868 he served as a senior teacher at the gymnasium in Frankfurt, where in 1871 he attained the title of professor.

Besides his editions of Varro's Satiræ Menippeae (1865), of the Anthologia Latina (1869; second edition, 1894), of Ovid (3 parts, 1871–74), of the Historia Apollonii Regis Tyri (1871, second edition, 1893), of Catullus (1884, "Die Gedichte des Catullus"), and of Phaedrus (1885), he published a suggestive essay, Idealisierung der Naturvölker des Nordens in den griechischen und römischen Litteraturen (1875), and two monographs on early German history, Das Rheinische Germanien in der antiken Litteratur (1892) and Das Rheinische Germanien in den antiken Inschriften (1914).

Notes

References

External links
 Geographi latini minores, Alexander Riese (ed.), Heilbronnae apud Henningeros fratres, 1878.

1840 births
1924 deaths
Writers from Frankfurt
Academic staff of Heidelberg University
German classical scholars
German classical philologists
20th-century German historians
German male non-fiction writers
21st-century German historians